Club Comunicaciones (Mercedes) is an Argentine sports club located in Mercedes, Corrientes. It is best known for its basketball team, which currently plays in the Liga Nacional de Básquet (LNB), the top division of the Argentine league system.

The club is internationally known because some of its players have represented their South American national teams at the FIBA Americas Championship.

It also has a soccer team that plays the Mercedeña Soccer League tournaments and at the national level played the 2017 Federal C Tournament . He was invited to participate in the Torneo Federal B for the 2017 season

Players

Current roster

Notable players

 Luis Cequeira
 Jose Fabio
 Jordan Adams

References

External links
 Comunicaciones on LNB website

 
Basketball teams in Argentina
Sports teams in Argentina
Basketball teams established in 1992
1992 establishments in Argentina
Basketball clubs in Corrientes Province